Jaroslav Šourek (7 September 1927 – 11 February 2003) was a Czech long-distance runner. He finished 35th in the marathon at the 1952 Summer Olympics. He was a multiple champion of Czechoslovakia in the marathon.

References

External links
 

1927 births
2003 deaths
Athletes (track and field) at the 1952 Summer Olympics
Czech male long-distance runners
Czech male marathon runners
Olympic athletes of Czechoslovakia
People from Brandýs nad Labem-Stará Boleslav
Sportspeople from the Central Bohemian Region